NGC 2277 is what appears to be an open cluster in the constellation Gemini. It was first observed on 20 April 1865 by the German astronomer Heinrich Louis d'Arrest. However, it is simply an asterism formed by several stars in the sky appearing close together.

See also 
 List of NGC objects

References 

Gemini
2277